Doun Ba  is a khum (commune) of Koas Krala District in Battambang Province in north-western Cambodia.

Villages

 Ba Srae
 Doun Ba
 Prey Phnheas
 Tuol Lieb
 Kouk Roka
 Khlaeng Kong
 Khvaeng
 Prey Paen

References

Communes of Battambang province
Koas Krala District